Batwing may refer to:

In fiction
Batplane, the Batman vehicle
Batwing (Marvel Comics), a Marvel Comics character
Batwing (DC Comics), a DC Comics character

Roller coasters
Batwing (roller coaster), a roller coaster at Six Flags America
Batwing (roller coaster element)
Batwing Spaceshot, a drop tower at Warner Bros. Movie World

Aviation
Stout Batwing

Other uses
Batwing sleeves, a type of sleeve
A type of bow tie
The common name of genus Atrophaneura

See also 
Bat wing, the wing of a bat